The nightlife in Bangkok, the capital city of Thailand, has traditionally had a reputation for rowdiness, but in 2011 it was reported that the city's crime rate had decreased.

On weekdays, most of Bangkok's nightlife takes places in the Red Light Districts of Soi Cowboy and Nana Plaza. Most venues outside of those areas are only open on weekends. Khaosan Road is another popular nightlife spot in Bangkok with mostly young backpackers roaming the streets.

Overview
The city's nightlife is the subject of the song One Night in Bangkok performed by Murray Head which includes the line: "One night in Bangkok can make a hard man humble". While the choruses extol Bangkok's reputation and exciting atmosphere in the song, the American in the music video would denounce the city, including its red-light district, "muddy old river" and "reclining Buddha". Bangkok is also well known for their massage parlors and the popular Eden Club; which offers "professional sexual services". One of the few rules of the Eden Club is to take two ladies that are equally skilled in pleasuring each other as the male client. Men can find sexual companionship amongst the local prostitutes.

Bangkok has also been discovered to be one of the safest and relaxed cities in the world. Their nightlife ranges from live music in jazz clubs to world-class restaurants. The once sleazy image of Bangkok at night has been virtually eradicated in the past 30 years. Bangkok is the only place in the world with pink taxi cabs that cater towards the LGBT tourists and residents. Even unescorted women can enjoy Bangkok safely and without any problems. Drug violations are often handed out more severe penalties than in the Western world and statutory rape is completely frowned upon.

The price of domestic beer in Bangkok ranges from $1.58 USD to $3.80 USD while the cost of imported beer ranges from $3.17 USD to $7.92 USD. The price of taxi service for a 1-kilometer drive ranges from $0.16 USD to $0.32 USD. Due to the lower prices for alcoholic beverages as opposed to the major cities of North America and Europe, the majority of the customers are the local students who are attending university. The Lamsalee sub-district caters more to the local crowds than international tourists; with their dance clubs catering towards their regular stream of customers. Tourists are more likely to head towards the Si Lom sub-district (with Soi 2 being more for the young adult crowd with nightclubs playing dance music and Soi 4 being more easy-going with a variety of restaurants and places to drink alcohol).

Ladyboy shows
Thailand is famous for its racy nightlife entertainment and amongst the madness is a thriving cabaret scene. Every night tourists pack into the various venues for an entertaining show that is full of laughs, music and dance. In Thailand the top shows include Calypso Cabaret, Simon Phuket, Tiffany's and popular newcomers Playhouse Theater.

Thailand is one of the most well-recognized centers of transgender and transvestite performance artists in the world. They are known as either kathoeys or "ladyboys." In fact, it is the most cost-effective place to acquire sex reassignment surgery along with having the highest standards of surgeons trained in performing operations of this kind. Most of these performers already had breast implants and typically perform before completely transitioning into womanhood by undergoing surgery on their genitals. All sorts of feminine legends are celebrated here from Hollywood divas to legendary female disco artists and even mythical creaturess from Thailand's glorious past. These transgender people are accepted even in rural Thailand. However, their genders are not legally recognized and suicide rates amongst ladyboy show performers are higher than the national average.

See also
 Prostitution in Thailand

References

Culture of Bangkok
Nightlife